Turig (3) (also Romanized as Tūrīg (3)) is a village in Chah Dadkhoda Rural District, Chah Dadkhoda District, Qaleh Ganj County, Kerman Province, Iran. At the 2006 census, its population was 317, in 68 families.

References 

Populated places in Qaleh Ganj County